Aqa Beyglu (also Romanized as Āqā Beyglū; also known as Āqā Beglū) is a village in Hasanlu Rural District, Mohammadyar District, Naqadeh County, West Azerbaijan Province, Iran. At the 2006 census, its population was 384, in 97 families.

References 

Populated places in Naqadeh County